Citrus is a planned Russian low-cost airline owned by S7 Airlines, with its headquarters in Moscow. The announcement from S7 to create a regional low-cost carrier was made in 2021. The airline's first flight was planned for July 2022, however all plans have been stopped for the foreseeable future.

History 
In 2008, S7 Airlines, a  Russian carrier, founded a subsidiary airline, Globus. Globus and S7 merged at the end of 2019. In 2021 the S7 Group announced their plans to create a regional low-cost carrier. A competition was held to decide airline's name. By its end, the airline slogan was also announced: connecting cities of Russia — «Cities of Russia».

On 28 January 2022 an Airbus A319 (VP-BHP) with code CTU-8899 made its flight to receive certification from the Federal Air Transport Agency. On 9 February 2022 Citrus received the certificate from Globus. By 2024, the airline plans to have a fleet consisting of 24 aircraft. Ticket sales were planned to commence in April 2022 and the first regular flight was slated for July 2022.

In June 2022, shortly before its planned inaugural flight, S7 announced plans for the new airline had been suspended for the foreseeable future due to the ordered aircraft not being delivered as part of sanctions against Russia.

Destinations 
Citrus plans to have predominantly domestic network, outside Moscow, then followed by CIS countries.

Fleet

See also
 List of airlines of Russia
 Transport in Russia

References

External links
Official website 

Airlines of Russia
Airlines established in 2021
Russian brands
Low-cost carriers
Russian companies established in 2022
Companies based in Moscow